Milgithea melanoleuca is a species of snout moth in the genus Milgithea. It was described by George Hampson in 1896. It is found in Colombia.

References

Moths described in 1896
Epipaschiinae